RoboBlockly is a web-based robot simulation environment for learning coding and math. Based on Blockly, it uses a simple puzzle-piece interface to program virtual Linkbot, Lego Mindstorms NXT and EV3, as well as to draw and animate for beginners to learn robotics, coding, math, science, and art. Blocks in RoboBlockly can be executed in debug mode step-by-step. All math activities in RoboBlockly are Common Core State Standards Mathematics compliant.

RoboBlockly is a project of the UC Davis Integration Engineering Laboratory and UC Davis Center for Integrated Computing and STEM Education (C-STEM). It is a part of the C-STEM Studio. RoboBlockly is provided free of charge.

RoboBlockly prepares students ready to program in Ch, C, and C++. The saved Ch code from RoboBlockly can be readily run without any modification in Ch, a C/C++ interpreter, to control hardware Linkbot and Lego Mindstorms NXT/EV3, or virtual Linkbot and NXT/EV3 in C-STEM Studio.

Users can share ideas and creations with the RoboBlockly user community through RoboBlockly Activity Portal.

RoboBlockly can run in any modern browser, without installation of any software, independent of operating system and device. It supports Web browsers IE, Edge, Firefox, Chrome, Safari, in platforms of desktops, tablets, and smartphones with Windows, Mac, iOS, Android, etc.

References

External links 
 C-STEM Center
 C-STEM Studio
 RoboBlockly

University of California, Davis
Visual programming languages